The Starlite Desperation is a rock band originally from Monterey, California. Combining elements of garage rock, punk, psychedelic music, goth rock, post punk, glam rock and 60's Pop. They released three full length records, 1 EP, and 3 singles, on several labels, including Gold Standard Laboratories. The founding members were Dante Adrian White, Jeff Ehrenberg, and Dana Lacono. In 1999, the band relocated to Detroit, Michigan and then to Los Angeles, California in 2002. In 2004, their song Born To Be Dizzy was used to close the film, The Heart Is Deceitful Above All Things, directed by Asia Argento. The band toured extensively in The United States, Canada and Europe with numerous groups, including Make-Up, Black Rebel Motorcycle Club, The Rapture, The International Noise Conspiracy, The Brian Jonestown Massacre, The Dirtbombs, The Donnas, The Ponys, and The Yeah Yeah Yeahs. The group was active from 1995-2008.

Discography 

1997 Our Product/It Rhymes With Bitch 7" Catchpenny records
1998 Shut My Door 7" Gold Standard Laboratories
1998 Show You What A Baby Won't LP/CD Gold Standard Laboratories
1999 Hot For Preacher 7" Gold Standard Laboratories Produced by Kid Congo Powers
2000 Go Kill Mice LP/CD Flapping Jet
2004 Violate A Sundae EP/CD Cold Sweat
2005 I Lost My Bees 7" (Split with Indian Jewelry ) Gold Standard Laboratories
2006 Don't Do Time CD Double Zombie
2008 Take It Personally LP/CD Infrasonic

References 

NME, April 28, 2000

Your Flesh, Issue # 41, 1999

Skyscraper Magazine, Issue #6, Summer 1999

Mishmash Magazine, January 2007

Dusted Magazine, Sept 30, 2008

Buddyhead Magazine, Jan 29 2010

Contact Music.com, May 2004

Ink 19, "Ready To Kill Mice", April, 2000

LA Weekly, August 28, 2008

La Weekly, March 3, 2008

Willamette Weekly, March 29, 2000

Epitonic, 11/29/01, Jesse Ashlock

Rock music groups from California